James William Colbert Jr. (December 15, 1920 – September 11, 1974) was an American physician and the first vice president of academic affairs at the Medical University of South Carolina (MUSC), serving in this capacity from 1969 until his death in a plane crash in 1974.  He is the father of Stephen Colbert and Elizabeth Colbert Busch.

Early life and education
Colbert (along with his twin sister, Margaret) was born on December 15, 1920, in the Bronx in New York City, to Mary (née Tormey) and James William Colbert. He was of mostly Irish descent, and was raised in a devout Roman Catholic household. He attended St. Augustine's School in Larchmont, New York for junior high school and Iona Preparatory in New Rochelle for high school. He received his A.B. from College of the Holy Cross in 1942 in philosophy, in which he was deeply interested; nevertheless, he later chose to pursue a medical career because, according to his daughter Margaret Colbert Keegan, "it just seemed to be the thing to do at the time." Colbert was accepted into the Columbia University College of Physicians and Surgeons in 1942, and received his M.D. there three years later, with a focus on immunology and infectious diseases. He then completed an internship at Bellevue Hospital before joining the U.S. Army Medical Corps in 1946.

Career
Colbert spent a year in Europe working for the U.S. Army Medical Corps, after which he completed a residency at Yale School of Medicine. In 1949, he rejoined the U.S. Army Medical Corps as a representative of the Armed Forces Epidemiological Board, director of the Hepatitis Research Team, and technical director of the Hepatitis Laboratory in Munich, Germany. Also after 1949, he joined the faculty of Yale School of Medicine, where he was promoted to assistant dean in 1951. In 1953, at the age of 32, he left Yale to become the dean of the St. Louis University School of Medicine, making him the youngest dean of a medical school at the time. He remained at St. Louis University until 1961, when he became associate director for extramural programs at the National Institute of Allergy and Infectious Diseases of the National Institutes of Health. During 1960 he served as chair of the St. Louis chapter of Doctors for Kennedy, to support John F. Kennedy's 1960 presidential campaign. In 1969, he and his family moved from Washington, D.C., where he had been working for the National Institutes of Health, to South Carolina. He became the first vice president for academic affairs at the Medical University of South Carolina on February 1, 1969, and remained in that position until his death. His work at the Medical University of South Carolina has been credited with "laying the foundation for MUSC's rise as a nationally renowned academic medical center."

Personal life
Colbert married his childhood sweetheart, Lorna Elizabeth Tuck, on August 26, 1944. They soon started a family, and had eleven children together: Jim, Ed, William, Mary, Margo, Tom, Jay, politician and businesswoman Elizabeth Colbert Busch, and comedian Stephen Colbert. Two of his sons, Paul and Peter, died in the same plane crash that killed him in 1974.

Death
Colbert, along with two of his sons, died in the crash of Eastern Air Lines Flight 212 on September 11, 1974, in Charlotte, North Carolina.

Recognition
In 2009, MUSC renamed its education center and library in memory of Colbert. In 2017, the first James W. Colbert Endowed Lectureship was held, also at MUSC, in honor of his legacy there. The lectureship was established in his memory by his family.

References

20th-century American physicians
American immunologists
Physicians from New York (state)
Medical University of South Carolina faculty
Yale School of Medicine faculty
Saint Louis University faculty
Columbia University Vagelos College of Physicians and Surgeons alumni
College of the Holy Cross alumni
Victims of aviation accidents or incidents in the United States
Accidental deaths in North Carolina
Stephen Colbert
1920 births
1974 deaths
Iona Preparatory School alumni
Scientists from New York (state)